Fieldston may refer to:
Fieldston, a neighborhood in the Bronx, New York.
The Ethical Culture Fieldston School, a private school in the Bronx neighborhood.